Mamta Raghuveer Singh Meena (born 4 April 1976) is an Indian politician and the member of Bharatiya Janata Party (BJP). She previously served as the Member of Madhya Pradesh Vidhan Sabha from 2013 to 2019.

Positions held

References 

″≈≈≈

Living people
1976 births
People from Guna, India
Bharatiya Janata Party politicians from Madhya Pradesh
Madhya Pradesh MLAs 2013–2018
Madhya Pradesh MLAs 2018–2023